Hueicolla is a beach and hamlet at the sparsely populated coast of La Unión commune, southern Chile. Hueicolla is located south of Colún Beach, west of Alerce Costero National Park and Cordillera Pelada and north of the mouth of Bueno River.

References

Landforms of Los Ríos Region
Populated places in Ranco Province
Beaches of Chile
Populated coastal places in Chile
Coasts of Los Ríos Region